Quemado de Güines is a municipality and town in the Villa Clara Province of Cuba.
It was founded in 1667.

Geography
The municipality is divided into the poblados of Caguaguas, Carahatas, Güines, Paso Cavado, Poblado, San Valentín and Zambumbia and Jose R. Riquelme.

It borders with the municipalities of Corralillo in the west, Sagua la Grande in the east, and Santo Domingo in south.

Demographics
In 2004, the municipality of Quemado de Güines had a population of 22,590.

Notable people
Osvaldo Farrés
Enrique Núñez Rodríguez (writer)

See also
Municipalities of Cuba
List of cities in Cuba

References

External links

 

Populated places in Villa Clara Province
1667 establishments in North America
Populated places established in 1667
1667 establishments in the Spanish Empire